Christianus Norbertus Theodorus "Christiaan" van Velzen (born 16 January 1932) is a Dutch retired shooter. He competed in the mixed small-bore rifle, prone, 50 m event at the 1980 Olympics and finished in 44th place.

References

 

1932 births
Possibly living people
Dutch male sport shooters
Olympic shooters of the Netherlands
Sportspeople from Voorburg
Shooters at the 1980 Summer Olympics